Raphitoma bicolor is a species of sea snail, a marine gastropod mollusc in the family Raphitomidae.

Description
The length varies between 6 mm and 15 mm.

Distribution
The entire Mediterranean Sea; NE Atlantic, from Wales to Canary Islands.

References

 Arnaud, P. M., 1978 Révision des taxa malacologiques méditerrannéens introduits par Antoine Risso Annales du Muséum d'Histoire Naturelle de Nice, "1977" 5 101-150
 Giannuzzi-Savelli R., Pusateri F. & Bartolini S., 2018. A revision of the Mediterranean Raphitomidae (Gastropoda: Conoidea) 5: loss of planktotrophy and pairs of species, with the description of four new species. Bollettino Malacologico 54, Suppl. 11: 1-77

External links
 Risso, A., 1826 - Histoire naturelle des principales productions de l'Europe Méridionale et particulièrement de celles des environs de Nice et des Alpes-Maritimes. Mollusques, vol. 4, p. 1-439, 12 pls
 Lectotype at MNHN, Paris
 

bicolor
Gastropods described in 1826